Saint-Hilarion is a parish municipality in Charlevoix Regional County Municipality, in the administrative region of Capitale-Nationale of the province of Quebec, in Canada.

Geography 
A few lakes such as Lac aux Bois-Verts and Lac à la Mine dot the territory. Inserted in the heart of the hinterland, at an altitude of 400 m, Saint-Hilarion sees its landscape marked by the church built on a hill which dominates the surrounding countryside, with several important farms.

History 
Colonization of the area began in 1830 with the arrival of the first clearers from the Éboulements. In 1864, the parish of Saint-Hilarion-de-Settrington was erected both civilly and canonically, which gave birth to the municipality of the township of Settrington in 1855, which became the municipality of the parish of Saint-Hilarion in 1956. The post office, opened in 1860, also takes the name of the township proclaimed in 1822, taken from that of a village in English Yorkshire. In 1892, it will receive its current name, identical to that of the municipality.

Toponymy 
As the Saint-Hilarionian winters were hasty and harsh, it is believed that the choice of the name of Saint Hilarion, a very austere monk from the beginning of Christianity, was imposed. Born in Tabatha, Palestine, around 291, he was to die around 371. In the north of the island of Cyprus a church Byzantine Architecture of the 10th century which bears the name of Saint-Hilarion. This extraordinary ancient site includes the ruins of a château built around a once important hermitage.

Personalities 
The most famous son of Saint-Hilarion remains the journalist Olivar Asselin (1874-1937) who participated in the founding of the newspaper Le Devoir in 1910.

Geology 
The municipality of Saint-Hilarion lies about ten kilometers from the center of the Charlevoix impact structure, discovered in 1968 and which, in 2009, is considered the thirteenth largest impact structure identified on Earth. (The municipality of Les Éboulements being the center). Its soil, as in many municipalities in Charlevoix, is full of impactite, rocky material found at the site of a meteoric impact. An asteroid with a diameter of 2 kilometers struck the Charlevoix region about 350 million years ago, creating an impact structure 56 kilometers in diameter. The Charlevoix region is known for its regular seismic activity within the Charlevoix Seismic Zone, even if the tremors are not always felt. There is a tremor every two days, very weak magnitude.

Major earthquakes felt in Saint-Hilarion:
1534, (IX on the Mercalli scale),
1663, (IX on the Mercalli scale),
1791, (VIII on the Mercalli scale),
1870, (IX on the Mercalli scale),
1925, (6.2 on the Richter scale),
1988, (5.9 on the Richter scale).

Demographics 

Population trend:
 Population in 2011: 1181 (2006 to 2011 population change: -0.8%)
 Population in 2006: 1191
 Population in 2001: 1148
 Population in 1996: 1215
 Population in 1991: 1185

Mother tongue:
 English as first language: 0%
 French as first language: 100%
 English and French as first language: 0%
 Other as first language: 0%

References

See also 
 Charlevoix Regional County Municipality
 Jean-Noël River
 Rivière du Premier Rang
 Rivière à la Loutre (Gouffre River tributary)
 Rivière de Chicago
 Saint Lawrence River
 List of municipalities in Quebec

Parish municipalities in Quebec
Incorporated places in Capitale-Nationale
Canada geography articles needing translation from French Wikipedia